Welsh baseball, is a bat-and-ball game played  in Wales. It is closely related to the game of rounders.

In the tradition of bat-and-ball games, baseball has roots going back centuries, and there are references to "baseball" from the beginning of the eighteenth century, and "rounders" from 1828. Baseball emerged as a distinct sport in 1892 when associations in Wales renamed the sport in favour of the more traditional rounders.

History

Development and foundation (1880s to 1892)
American professional baseball teams toured Britain in 1874 and 1889, and had a great effect on similar sports in Britain. In Wales, a strong community game had already developed with skills and plays more in keeping with the American game and the Welsh began to informally adopt the name "baseball" (Pêl Fas), to reflect the American style. By the 1890s, calls were made to follow the success of other working class sports like Rugby in Wales and adopt a distinct set of rules and bureaucracy.

During the 1892 season rules for the game of "baseball" were agreed and the game was officially codified. This was followed by the 'Liverpool Rounders Association' and the 'South Wales Rounders Association' renaming themselves for "Baseball" and by the end of the season, baseball teams from Liverpool and Lancashire in England were invited to play matches at Cardiff Arms Park with the express purpose of popularising "the improved version of the old-fashioned game of rounders".

Edwardian boom and first internationals (1892 to 1918)

The growth and popularity of the early game saw the first approach from American baseball to amalgamate the sports but no agreement was reached. As the number of amateur clubs expanded in Cardiff, Newport and Merseyside a Wales-England fixture was proposed to promote the sport further. The inaugural international match was held on 3 August 1908 at the Harlequins Ground in Roath, Cardiff (St Peter's RFC). Wales won the match 122–118 with batsmen and captain Lew Lewis hitting a number of balls 'over the house tops'.

The game in Cardiff had already become a popular summer pursuit among the city's rugby players and the match saw three Cardiff RFC players take the field, including Viv Huzzey, who also represented Wales in rugby union and rugby league. The next international was held in 1914 at Goodison Park, Liverpool. The English won the match in front of 4,000 spectators, but annual internationals would not start until after the war.

Cultural impact and women's games (1918 to 1929)

In 1905 the South Wales and Monmouthshire Baseball Association had just fifteen member clubs, by 1921 the game had become ubiquitous in its heartland cities, with the newly renamed Welsh Baseball Union comprising sixty clubs, all within the Cardiff and Newport areas.

The game continued to gain popularity during the interwar period and was an "integral part of local culture" in Cardiff and Newport. Schoolboy leagues were established, and Cardiff saw the first schoolgirls league. Welsh baseball was notable for its female participation which began during the First World War among the young women working in factories. A women's league was set up in Cardiff in 1922 and in 1926 the first women's international match took place between Wales and England.

The crowd at the 1924 Cardiff Arms Park men's international reached 10,000 spectators for the first time and the 1925 fixture at the Police Athletic Ground, Liverpool, saw a crowd of 12,000. The growth of the international fixture had brought increased scrutiny on the game's arbitration and rules, as such the English Baseball Association and the Welsh Baseball Union formed the International Baseball Board to oversee the internationals in 1927.

Depression, war and the American game (1929 to 1948)
The Great Depression saw further increases in the number of clubs and players, and local club matches would attract thousands of spectators as community sports provided a welcome distraction during a turbulent period. The Cardiff & District League boasted 37 teams by 1929, 19 of which were based in the working class areas of Splott and Grangetown alone.

The 1930s saw American baseball's popularity peak in Wales with professional teams sharing grounds with soccer clubs (10,000 spectators attending the biggest games), and saw the British team winning the inaugural Baseball World Cup in 1938. The American game was supported by more touring teams from America and Japan; this afforded the Welsh teams a chance to test themselves against the more widely appreciated (and often professional) American teams. In one such game on August 27, 1938, the Penylan club side beat the London Americans at Cardiff Arms Park. The contest saw one innings under "Welsh" rules, and three innings under U.S. rules.

An American league was also established in Cardiff in 1939, but the professional American game ended with the outbreak of war, and would never regain such widespread popularity.

Post-war zenith (1948 to 1970)
Although internationals ceased during wartime, sides would stage successful games with the crews of American warships using either American or Welsh rules. Home victories emboldened the local's belief in the ability of the Welsh players. This pride and belief was evident when the annual internationals resumed in 1948 at Cardiff's Castle Grounds, with a record 16,000 spectators in attendance and Welsh legend Ted Peterson leading Wales to victory. This increasing popularity of the game saw it develop a distinct community appeal. In addition to the now established clubs, churches, stores, factories, and bars would form teams, and the game became the heart of social activities for many, especially in Cardiff. 

The 1950s and 1960s saw more dominance for the Welsh game. Welsh legend Paddy Hennessey made his international debut in the 1957 win over England. He would go on to be widely recognised as a great of the game, and the fastest bowler of the era. The 1964 International saw Hennessey (as captain) demolish his rivals' batting line up for a record six runs in 30 balls and just nine minutes in front of a crowd of 6,000 at the Maindy Stadium. This record is notable as it would not be surpassed for 50 years, when Wales international Matthew Hopkins managed the same feat for the loss of just one run in the 2014 fixture at Whiteheads Ground, Newport. The record remains one of the longest standing in global sports.

Decline in popularity (1970 to 2000)

The sport gained a new audience as live coverage of the international fixture and some club matches became a feature of Welsh television in the 1970s and 1980s, but the last decades of the century were generally characterised by a continued decline in attendances and participation. The international fixture continued to draw interest with BBC Cymru Wales broadcast highlights of the international game until the 1990s; by then the match was seen as a curiosity with radio and TV features the limit of its national exposure. The prospect of watching Wales' star rugby players play the game also ended in 1995 with the introduction of professional contracts, ceasing their unsanctioned participation in other sports.

Modern era

The centenary international was held in Cardiff on 19 July 2008, with Wales winning their tenth victory in a row by an innings and 44. As well as the full international, similar internationals are held for 'B' teams and for junior grades. The match was the 83rd international played between the two nations, and was Wales' 61st victory; England had won 20 and two games were declared draws due to inclement weather (1957 and 1998). Spectator numbers were reported to be between 1,000 and 2,000.

The annual England–Wales fixture continued until 2015 when England withdrew, unable to field enough players. The end of the international fixture (and the exposure it brought the game) had a dramatic effect on player numbers in Wales. By 2017, the Welsh men's league and cup fixtures were abandoned mid-season due to a lack of players at some member clubs. Since then the men's game has continued through ad-hoc fixtures. The women's league remains in operation.

Subsequent years have seen the Welsh Baseball Union working with local councils to reintroduce the sport into high schools. This has seen the sport played beyond its traditional areas (especially the South Wales Valleys), as the game allows for mixed gender participation, is easy to understand, and can be adapted to accommodate a high number of players.

Notable players 
Among those who achieved fame through their baseball exploits were Ted Peterson, whose international appearances stretched from the 1930s to 1960s, and Paddy Hennessey, renowned for his fast bowling. The sport's appeal to winter footballers attracted a number of players more notable for their rugby or soccer careers.

Welsh Rugby players Viv Huzzey, Terry Holmes, Mark Ring, David Bishop, and Wigan Rugby League legend and record points scorer Jim Sullivan all played the sport, often during rugby's off season.

Association footballers include Welshmen John Toshack, George Whitcombe, Terry Yorath, Nathan Blake and Phil Dwyer, and Everton and England football star Dixie Dean.

Differences between the Welsh and North American games 
The sport differs in a number of ways from the internationally known game of North American baseball.
 Delivery of the ball – The ball is thrown underarm, similar to softball. As in cricket the delivery is known as bowling. In North American baseball it is delivered overhand, sidearm, or underarm and is called pitching.
 Number of players – There are 11 players in a team with no substitutions allowed. North American baseball uses nine players on a team (not counting a "designated hitter"); while substitutions are allowed, a player who leaves the game may not re-enter it.
 Number of innings – (Note that Welsh baseball uses the cricket terminology of "innings" as both singular and plural, while baseball uses "inning" for the singular.) In Welsh baseball, each team has two innings. An innings ends when all 11 players are either dismissed or stranded on base. A regulation game of North American baseball consists of nine innings, and each team's half of an inning ends when three outs (dismissals) are recorded.
 Posts/Bases – Where North American baseball has bases the Welsh version has 'posts' (sometimes referred to as bases). These are designated by poles rather than bags.
 Bat – the bat has a flat striking surface, where in North American baseball it is entirely round.
 Scoring system – In Welsh baseball players score a run for every base reached after hitting the ball. The player will not subsequently score when moving around the bases on another player's hit. The equivalent of a home run scores four runs. As in cricket a bonus run can be awarded for excessively-wide deliveries. In North American baseball, a player scores a run only on a successful circuit of all four bases, whether on his own or another player's hit, or by other means such as a walk or stolen base.
 Uniform – Players wear colourful jerseys and shorts with Welsh teams often wearing rugby kits.
 Field of play – The Welsh game has no foul area, a ball can be legally hit (and scored off of) in any direction, where in North American baseball it has to be hit in the zone bounded by the lines to first base and third base.
Despite these similarities with cricket, the game is much more like North American baseball in style and operates on a near identical, but smaller, diamond. There are also many similarities to rounders, which is often considered a transitional game between cricket and baseball. The basic concepts of Welsh baseball cross-blend the basic concepts of cricket and the more standard versions of rounders.

In popular culture 
The sport is the subject of a song, "The Baseball Song", by The Hennessys, from their 1984 album Cardiff After Dark.

Notes

References
 Martin Johnes, 'Baseball, class and community in south Wales, c.1880–1950', International Journal of the History of Sport, 17,4 (2000), 153–66.
John Arlott, ed. (1975). The Oxford Companion to Sports and Games. Oxford University Press
Andrew Hignell and Gwyn Prescott, eds (2007). Cardiff Sporting Greats. Stadia

External links

Welsh Baseball
Welsh Ladies Baseball Union 
Welsh Baseball Union

Video
Guide to Baseball on YouTube Part 1
Guide to Baseball on YouTube Part 2

British baseball in the United Kingdom
Sport in Cardiff
Sport in Newport, Wales
Baseball genres
Ball and bat games
Team sports